Bradley Howard Finstad (born May 30, 1976) is an American farmer, agricultural consultant, and politician serving as the U.S. representative for . Finstad represents a large section of southern Minnesota situated along the border with Iowa. The district is mostly rural and includes the cities of Rochester, Mankato, Winona, Austin, Owatonna, and Worthington. A member of the Republican Party, Finstad served in the Minnesota House of Representatives from 2003 until 2009.

Finstad previously served as an area director for the Minnesota Farm Bureau and as the agricultural policy advisor to U.S. Representative Mark Kennedy. In 2002, he was elected to the Minnesota House of Representatives, where he served three terms. While in the state house, Finstad served on several legislative and statewide agricultural committees. In 2017 President Donald Trump appointed Finstad as the USDA Rural Development director for Minnesota. He served until shortly after Trump left office in 2021. In addition to his government service, Finstad operates a family farm.

Finstad was elected to represent Minnesota's 1st congressional district in a 2022 special election, to finish the term of the late Jim Hagedorn.

Early life and education 
Finstad was born in New Ulm, Minnesota, on May 30, 1976. A fourth-generation resident of the area, he grew up on his family’s farm in Brown County, Minnesota which his family has operated for several generations. He earned a Bachelor of Science degree in agricultural education from the University of Minnesota.

Early political career 
After graduating from college, Finstad joined the human resources department of Christensen Family Farms in Brown County, Minnesota. He later briefly worked as an area director for the Minnesota Farm Bureau before joining the staff of Congressman Mark Kennedy, serving as an agricultural advisor.

Finstad was elected to the Minnesota House of Representatives in 2002 and took office in 2003. During his final term in the legislature, he served as assistant minority leader. He also served on the Rural Health Advisory Committee under Minnesota Governor Tim Pawlenty. He left the House in 2009.

From 2008 to 2017, Finstad was CEO of the Center for Rural Policy and Development, a nonprofit policy research organization based in St. Peter, Minnesota. He also worked for an agricultural research and consulting company. In November 2017, President Donald Trump appointed Finstad as Minnesota state director of USDA Rural Development. Finstad left this position after Trump left office in 2021.

Finstad next joined the Minnesota Turkey Growers Association as interim executive director. He left this position in 2022.

U.S. House of Representatives

Elections

2022 special 

After Congressman Jim Hagedorn died in office, Finstad announced his candidacy for the Republican nomination to serve the rest of Hagedorn's term in the 2022 Minnesota's 1st congressional district special election. In the May 24 special Republican primary election, Finstad defeated state Representative Jeremy Munson and seven other candidates to win the nomination with 38.1% of the vote to Munson's 36.9%, Jennifer Carnahan's 8.0%, and Matt Benda's 7.2%, with several other candidates splitting the rest of the vote. Finstad won the August 2022 special election by around 4 points against Democratic-Farmer-Labor (DFL) nominee Jeff Ettinger, a former Hormel CEO and a first-time candidate.

2022 

Winning a second primary against Munson, Finstad defeated Ettinger again in the November 8 general election, with 53.9% of the vote to Ettinger's 42.3%.

Tenure 
Finstad was sworn in by House Speaker Nancy Pelosi on August 12, 2022. Later that day he voted against the Inflation Reduction Act of 2022.

Caucus memberships 

 Republican Main Street Partnership

Committee memberships 

 Committee on Agriculture
 Subcommittee on Nutrition, Foreign Agriculture and Horticulture (Chair)
 Committee on Armed Services

References

External links
 Official website
 Campaign website

|-

1976 births
Living people
Republican Party members of the Minnesota House of Representatives
Republican Party members of the United States House of Representatives from Minnesota
People from Brown County, Minnesota
People from New Ulm, Minnesota
Trump administration personnel
United States Department of Agriculture officials
University of Minnesota alumni
21st-century American politicians